Charan Raj is an Indian composer and singer known for his work in Kannada cinema. For his work in Jeerjimbe (2016), he was awarded the Karnataka State Film Award for Best Music Director.

Early life
Raj trained in Carnatic music with Perumbavoor G. Raveendranath and in Classical music with Neecia Majolly. He also holds a grade eight certificate in piano from the London School of Music.

Career
Raj's first major success came when Winds of Samsara, an album of Ricky Kej and Wouter Kellerman won the Grammy Award for Best New Age Album in 2015. The album also featured vocals by Raj. During the time, he also worked as an arranger for composers such as Prashant Pillai.

Raj's first work in Kannada films came in Harivu in 2014. He received acclaim for his work in Godhi Banna Sadharana Mykattu. He scored for Pushpaka Vimana. For his work in Jeerjimbe (2016), he was awarded the Karnataka State Film Award for Best Music Director.

Raj received praise for his music in the 2018 film Tagaru. The soundtrack included tracks with blend of "electronic score" and "traditional sounds". It was composed with each track based on a different "human emotion" "such as love, anger and fear" rather than situation-based nature of tracks. In its review of the film, the New Indian Express wrote, "Charan Raj's music raises the tempo of the narrative with good songs, and lets it flow seamlessly with the right background score."

Discography

Awards

References

External links
 

Living people
21st-century classical composers
Indian film score composers
Indian male playback singers
Film musicians from Karnataka
Kannada film score composers
Kannada playback singers
Indian male film score composers
21st-century Indian male singers
21st-century Indian singers
1985 births